The Caudata are a group of amphibians containing the extant salamanders (Urodela) and all extinct species of amphibians more closely related to salamanders than to frogs. They are typically characterized by a superficially lizard-like appearance, with slender bodies, blunt snouts, short limbs projecting at right angles to the body, and the presence of a tail in both larvae and adults.

Disagreement exists between different authorities as to the definition of the terms "Caudata" and "Urodela". Some maintain that Urodela should be restricted to the crown group, with Caudata being used for the total group. Others restrict the name Caudata to the crown group and use Urodela for the total group. The former approach seems to be most widely adopted and is used in this article.

Evolution
The origins and evolutionary relationships between the three main groups of amphibians (apodans, urodeles and anurans) is a matter of debate. A 2005 molecular phylogeny, based on rDNA analysis, suggested that the first divergence between these three groups took place soon after they had branched from the lobe-finned fish in the Devonian (around 360 million years ago), and before the breakup of the supercontinent Pangaea. The briefness of this period, and the speed at which radiation took place, may help to account for the relative scarcity of amphibian fossils that appear to be closely related to lissamphibians. However, more recent studies have generally found more recent (Late Carboniferous to Early Permian) age for the basalmost divergence among lissamphibians.

The earliest known fossil salamanders include Kokartus honorarius from the Middle Jurassic of Kyrgyzstan and three species of the apparently neotenic, aquatic Marmorerpeton from England and Scotland  of a similar date. They looked superficially like robust modern salamanders but lacked a number of anatomical features that characterise all modern salamanders. Karaurus sharovi from the Upper Jurassic of Kazakhstan resembled modern mole salamanders in morphology and probably had a similar burrowing lifestyle. In 2020, new specimens of the previously enigmatic tetrapod Triassurus from the Middle Triassic of Kyrgyzstan were described, revealing it to be the oldest known caudatan  and this conclusion has been supported by subsequent analyses.  

The Cryptobranchoidea (primitive salamanders) and the Salamandroidea, also known as Diadectosalamandroidei, (advanced salamanders) are believed to be sister groups. Both seem to have appeared before the end of the Jurassic, the former being exemplified by Chunerpeton tianyiensis, Pangerpeton sinensis, Jeholotriton paradoxus, Regalerpeton weichangensis, Liaoxitriton daohugouensis and Iridotriton hechti, and the latter by Beiyanerpeton jianpingensis. By the Upper Cretaceous, most or all of the living salamander families had probably appeared.  However, recent phylogenetic analysis suggest that several fossil species previously thought to represent crown group salamanders may actually represent members of the stem-group. 

All known fossil salamanders and all extinct species fall under the order Caudata, while sometimes the extant species are grouped together as the Urodela. There are about 655 extant species of salamander.

References

.
Tetrapod unranked clades
Bathonian first appearances
Taxa named by Giovanni Antonio Scopoli